Jack Dale may refer to:
 Jack Dale (coach), American football and basketball coach
 Jack Dale (ice hockey) (born 1945), American ice hockey player
 Jack Dale (cricketer) (1901–1965), English cricketer
 Jack D. Dale, Superintendent of Fairfax County Public Schools, Virginia